Multi Purpose Chemical (MPC) were an alternative metal band from Liverpool, England. The band had two changes to the line-up; in 2006 Ross McFarlane left his role of drummer and was replaced by Mel Stewart, and since August 2007, Rob Hoey no longer holds his role of guitarist. Obsessive Compulsive's "Giz" took over guitar duties until May 2008 when Adam Lucas became the band's full-time guitarist.

History
In early 2004 MPC's first recording of a 3-track demo CD, containing recordings of "Cult," "Death For Sale" and "Hate Magnet" (with a bonus track of their Cypress Hill-inspired song, "Hop Skip Jump"), earned the band a record deal with Liverpool's Honey Records. MPC went on to record a 4-track EP, "Cult EP", produced by Ace (Skunk Anansie), containing new recordings of "Hate Magnet", "Death For Sale", "Embrace" and "Cult", with their first music video of "Cult" that appeared on MTV2 Europe's 120 Minutes (UK TV series). The EP was released on 28 November 2005, by Honey Records.

In 2006, MPC recorded their album ...And Four More Ways To Fight. It was originally expected to be released in late 2006, but after being set back a number of times, it was finally released on 29 October 2007.

Before the release of the full-length album came their first official single, "Human", which appeared on MTV2 Europe's 120 Minutes (UK TV series) and is only available as an Internet download through iTunes and IndieStore.com. The 'zebra head' and animal images associated with "Human" will no longer be used but are heavily featured in the song's accompanying music video (based on Falling Down).

MPC played their final gig at Liverpool's Hub Festival on 24 May 2009.

Members
 Andres (Dreza/Dre) Lefevre - vocals
 Jim (Big Jim) Wilson - bass guitar
 Mel (Diablo) Stewart - drums
 Adam Lucas - lead guitar

Discography
Demo CD (2004)
Cult EP (2005)
Human Single (2006)
...And Four More Ways To Fight Debut album (2007)
E = MPC2 (It Came From Brooklyn) Follow-up album (2009)

Media interest
MPC was picked by Planet Loud as its "Hot Pick for 2006"
"We interviewed these guys a few months ago as they'd just finished a mammoth trek around the UK toilets. Mixing the eclectism of System Of A Down with the mental ragga-rock of Skindred, we think these guys are going to be huge in 2006."
Planet Loud entry for Multi Purpose Chemical. 
Alternative-Zine interview with MPC's bassist, Jim Wilson
Gigwise, another review of MPC Live
Drowned in Sound Review of MPC's Cult EP 
Manx Bands Review of MPC
Gigwise review of MPC Live
[http://www.getreadytorock.com/reviews/multi_purpose_chemical.htm Get Ready to Rock'''s review of MPC's Cult E.P. ]
MPC's first music video, Cult, has been shown a few times on the music channel MTV2.
MPC was mentioned in Kerrang magazine, in an article based on the Dog Eat Dog UK tour on which MPC were scheduled to play
The release of ...And Four More Ways To Fight saw generally positive reviews including features in Total Guitar and Big Cheese magazines. 
In a review of ...And Four More Ways To Fight Rock Sound'' magazine compared Andres Lefevre's vocal style to Serj Tankian: 
A catalogue of strange noises and words spew from Andres Lefevre's mouth, as if he's System Of A Down man Serj Tankian's distant English cousin.
This is in spite of the fact that Lefevre is actually American and of Peruvian descent.

Live/tours
Multi Purpose Chemical have performed hundreds of small shows around the UK, including in Liverpool, Manchester and London, and smaller towns such as Winnington in Cheshire.

MPC has twice toured the Isle of Man, and has performed on tours with bands such as Skindred, Johnny Truant, Sikth and Trashlight Vision as well as support slots for OPM, Mad Capsule Markets and Will Haven.

External links
Their Myspace Page
The Multi Purpose Chemical Official Website
Honey Records; Record label

English heavy metal musical groups
Musical groups from Liverpool
British alternative metal musical groups